Mamadou Sylla Diallo (born 26 January 2003) is a Spanish professional footballer who currently plays as a midfielder for Almería B. He is a product of the Aston Villa Academy, having moved to England from his native Catalonia aged 15. He made his professional debut for Aston Villa in January 2021 against Liverpool in the FA Cup. He also won the FA Youth Cup with Aston Villa's Under-18 side in the 2020/2021 campaign.

Personal life
Sylla was born in Spain to Guinean parents.

Career
Sylla was named in the Aston Villa starting line-up for his senior debut on 8 January 2021 in an FA Cup third round tie against Liverpool. On 24 May 2021, he was part of the Aston Villa U18s squad that won the FA Youth Cup, beating Liverpool U18s 2–1 in the final.

On 23 August 2021, Sylla signed for Segunda División team UD Almería on a permanent transfer. He was moved to their B-Team, and made his league debut in the Tercera División RFEF on 12 September 2021, in a 0–0 draw against Huétor Tájar.

Career statistics

Club

Notes

Honours

Aston Villa U18s 
FA Youth Cup: 2020–21

References

2003 births
Living people
Spanish footballers
Guinean footballers
Spanish sportspeople of African descent
Spanish people of Guinean descent
Guinean expatriate footballers
Spanish expatriate footballers
Association football midfielders
EC Granollers players
Aston Villa F.C. players
Guinean expatriate sportspeople in England
Spanish expatriate sportspeople in England
Expatriate footballers in England
UD Almería B players
Tercera Federación players